Rudhraighe Ó Flaithbheartaigh was King of Iar Connacht.

Annalistic references

 M1207.6. Cathal Crovderg O'Conor, King of Connaught, expelled Hugh O'Flaherty, and gave his territory to his own son, Hugh O'Conor.
 M1214. Brian, the son of Rory O'Flaherty, the son of the Lord of West Connaught, died.

See also

 Ó Flaithbertaigh

References

 West or H-Iar Connaught Ruaidhrí Ó Flaithbheartaigh, 1684 (published 1846, ed. James Hardiman).
 Origin of the Surname O'Flaherty, Anthony Matthews, Dublin, 1968, p. 40.
 Irish Kings and High-Kings, Francis John Byrne (2001), Dublin: Four Courts Press, 
 Annals of Ulster at CELT: Corpus of Electronic Texts at University College Cork
 Byrne, Francis John (2001), Irish Kings and High-Kings, Dublin: Four Courts Press, 

People from County Galway
Rudhraighe
13th-century Irish monarchs